Rapper Gone Bad is an album by the American rapper Mac Dre. It was released on September 28, 1999, on Romp Records/Swerve Music in conjunction with Sumo Productions. There are guest appearances from Warren G, Kokane, Little Bruce, and B-Legit, among others.

The album peaked at No. 49 on Billboard's Top R&B/Hip-Hop Albums chart.

Track listing
Intro (featuring Sky Balla)
I've Been Down (featuring Harm)
Rapper Gone Bad (produced by Wilson Hankins & Lev Berlak)
Fast Money (featuring Warren G, Kokane & Dutches)
Fish Head Stew (produced by Wilson Hankins & Lev Berlak)
How Yo' Hood
Fortytwo Fake (featuring PSD)  produced by Wilson Hankins & Lev Berlak
Fire (featuring Big Lurch and Harm) Produced by Tone Capone
Global (featuring Dubee)
Fuck Off the Party (featuring The WhoRidas) produced by Wilson Hankins & Lev Berlak
Valley Joe (featuring B-Legit, PSD & Little Bruce)
Mac Stabber produced by Wilson Hankins & Lev Berlak
I'm a Thug (featuring Cutthroat Committee)
We Made It (featuring Trill Real, Dubee, Magnolia Chop, Sleep Dank & J-Diggs)

Original release didn't include track 14.

References

1999 albums
Mac Dre albums
Albums produced by Warren G
Gangsta rap albums by American artists